Scopula sentinaria is a moth of the  family Geometridae. It is found from Alaska to Labrador, south in the prairies to southern Manitoba, Saskatchewan, Alberta and British Columbia. In the mountains it ranges south to Colorado. The species is also found in northern Russia and the Sayan Mountains. The habitat consists of dry shrubby clearings and edges.

The wingspan is 20–27 mm. Adults are dull red-brown to bright rusty-orange. The basal half of the forewings is usually suffused with darker scales. Adults are on wing from early June to late July in one generation in North America.

Larvae have been reared on Polygonum aviculare. Fourth or fifth instar larvae overwinter.

Subspecies
Scopula sentinaria sentinaria (North America)
Scopula sentinaria rufinaria (Staudinger, 1861) (northern Russia)
Scopula sentinaria rufinularia (Staudinger, 1901) (Sayan Mountains)

References

Moths described in 1837
sentinaria
Moths of North America
Moths of Asia